John J. Bursch (born 1972) was the 10th Michigan Solicitor General. He was appointed by Michigan Attorney General Bill Schuette on February 28, 2011. Prior to being Michigan Solicitor General, Bursch served as chair of the Appellate Practice and Public-Affairs Litigation Groups at Warner Norcross & Judd. Bursch argued in more than 6% of all the cases the U.S. Supreme Court heard during his tenure as solicitor general. Bursch returned to private practice at Warner Norcross & Judd in December 2013, and founded his own law firm in 2016, Bursch Law.

On April 28, 2015, Bursch was one of three attorneys who argued before the U.S. Supreme Court in Obergefell v. Hodges arguing state bans on same-sex marriage to be constitutional. Bursch lost, resulting in the legalization of same-sex marriage everywhere in the United States. Obergefell is considered one of the most important civil rights cases to come before the U.S. Supreme Court in modern history. He also argued before the Supreme Court in R.G. & G.R. Harris Funeral Homes Inc. v. Equal Employment Opportunity Commission, a case involving employment discrimination where an employee was fired for being transgender. The case was consolidated with Bostock v. Clayton County, Georgia at the Supreme Court, where the employers lost and gay and transgender people were recognized as protected under Title VII sex-discrimination protections in employment.

Currently, Bursch works as senior counsel at the conservative Christian legal organization Alliance Defending Freedom and is active in the Federalist Society. The ADF focuses on curtailing rights for LGBT people, expanding religious practice in public institutions, and restricting access to abortion and contraception. Bursch is involved in a number of cases aimed at restricting the rights of transgender students, for example in the appeal of Kluge v. Brownsburg Community School Corporation.

Education
Bursch graduated from Grand Ledge High School in 1990, and attended Western Michigan University, where he received degrees in mathematics and music summa cum laude and graduated from the Lee Honors College in 1994. In 1997, Bursch received his J.D. magna cum laude from the University of Minnesota Law School, where he served as chief note and comment editor for the Minnesota Law Review and as commencement speaker. 

Bursch currently has a wife and five children.

Legal career

From 1997 to 1998, Bursch served as a law clerk to James B. Loken on the United States Court of Appeals for the Eighth Circuit. Bursch then entered private practice with Warner Norcross & Judd, where he founded and chaired the firm's Appellate Practice and Public-Affairs Litigation groups. From 2011 to 2013, Bursch served as Michigan's 10th Solicitor General. As Michigan Solicitor General, Bursch argued 12 times in the Michigan Supreme Court and eight times in the U.S. Supreme Court. Afterwards, he returned to private practice with Warner Norcross & Judd until 2016, when he formed his own private law firm.

, Bursch has appeared in front of the Michigan Supreme Court 27 times, and in front of the US Supreme Court 11 times. He has since represented the respondents in the landmark Supreme Court Case, Obergefell v. Hodges, and is represented Nick Lyon in a case on the Flint Water Crisis.

Obergefell v. Hodges and other anti-LGBT rights cases
Obergefell v. Hodges was a landmark federal lawsuit challenging whether states might refuse to license same-sex marriages, or recognize same-sex marriages from other jurisdictions. It was the result of a consolidation of six lower-court cases, from the states of Michigan, Ohio, Kentucky, and Tennessee. The original Michigan case was DeBoer v. Snyder, where a same-sex couple argued that Michigan's adoption law was unconstitutional, and sued then Governor Richard Snyder. During this initial case, Bursch was the counsel of record for Governor Snyder.

Bursch, who had left the position as Michigan Solicitor General, was invited to argue this case before the Supreme Court by then State Attorney General Bill Schuette. He, along with Joseph R. Whalen, an associate solicitor general from Tennessee, represented the states refusing to recognize same-sex marriages. Oral arguments were heard on April 28, 2015. He and Whalen lost the case.

Recognition
Michigan Super Lawyers has listed Bursch as one of Michigan's Top 100 lawyers. He has also been listed in The Best Lawyers in America and is a Fellow of The Litigation Counsel of America. Bursch has received three Distinguished Brief Awards for his advocacy before the Michigan Supreme Court. And in 2010, Bursch was appointed to the American Bar Association committee that reviewed Elena Kagan's writings before her Senate confirmation as a United States Supreme Court Justice. John is a Life Member of the Sixth Circuit Judicial Conference, and in 2011, he was selected to be a Fellow of the Michigan State Bar Association. Also in 2011, Bursch became the inaugural recipient of The Carl and Winifred Lee Honors College Alumni Achievement Award at Western Michigan University. In 2012, the National Association of Attorneys General (NAAG) awarded Bursch and three colleagues a Supreme Court Best Brief Award for their petitioner's brief in Howes v. Fields. In 2013, NAAG again awarded Bursch and two colleagues a Supreme Court Best Brief Award for their cert. petition in Schuette v. Coalition to Defend, and in 2014, Bursch was again awarded the Best Brief Award for his brief in Burt v. Titlow.

References

External links

1972 births
Solicitors General of Michigan
Living people
Michigan lawyers
Michigan Republicans
University of Minnesota Law School alumni
Western Michigan University alumni
21st-century American lawyers